Open Access Week is an annual scholarly communication event focusing on open access and related topics. It takes place globally during the last full week of October in a multitude of locations both on- and offline. Typical activities include talks, seminars, symposia, or the announcement of open access mandates or other milestones in open access. For instance, the Royal Society chose Open Access Week 2011 to announce that they would release the digitized backfiles of their archives, dating from 1665 to 1941.

History 

Open Access Week has its roots in the National Day of Action for Open Access on February 15, 2007, organized across the United States by Students for Free Culture and the Alliance for Taxpayer Access.
In 2008, October 14 was designated Open Access Day, and the event became global. In 2009, the event was expanded to a week, from October 19–23. In 2010, it took place from October 18–24. From 2011 onwards, it is taking place at the last full week of October each year.

Themes 
In the early years, organisations celebrating Open Access Week set their own themes. Since 2012, an 'official' theme was established and received special attention at the corresponding kick-off events held at the World Bank.
2022: "Open for Climate Justice"
2021: “It Matters How We Open Knowledge: Building Structural Equity”
2020: "Open with Purpose: Taking Action to Build Structural Equity and Inclusion"
2019: "Open for Whom? Equity in Open Knowledge"
2018: "Designing Equitable Foundations for Open Knowledge"
2017: "Open In Order To"
2016: "Open in Action"
2015: "Open for Collaboration"
2014: "Generation Open" 
2013: "Redefining impact"
2012: "Set the default to open access"

Events 
Each year's Open Access Week events are recorded in the Open Access Directory and the Open Access Week website.

See also 
Science festival

References

External links

 openaccessweek.org, a dedicated online platform for Open Access Week, sponsored by SPARC
 
 International Open Access Week at the University of Porto (Presence at the OA International Site)
 Open Access Week in France
 Open Access Week 2013 at the University of Cape Town

Library science
Academia
Open access projects
October observances
Scholarly communication
Articles containing video clips
Awareness weeks
2009 establishments